The batterie de cuisine (French; literally, kitchen artillery, i.e., kitchenware) is the range of tools and pans used in a professional kitchen. It includes the knives, frying pans, bakeware and the complete set of kitchen utensils required for cooking and for the making of desserts, pastries and confectionery. It does not include any of the fixed equipment such as cooking ranges, refrigeration equipment, etc.

References

External links

Batterie de Cuisine. CooksInfo.com. Published 02/22/2007. Updated 12/05/2010. Web. Retrieved 11/18/2012.
Batterie de Cuisine. Rebecca Franklin, About.com. Web. Retrieved 11/18/2012.

Cooking

fr:Batterie de cuisine